Biel Company may refer to:

Biel Company (footballer) (born 1992), Spanish footballer
Biel Company (politician) (born 1963), Spanish politician